Mark Michie is a brigadier general in the Wisconsin Army National Guard.

Biography
Michie graduated from the University of Wisconsin–Stevens Point in 1985. He is a resident of Harshaw, Wisconsin.

Career
Michie enlisted in the Wisconsin Army National Guard in September 1980. He was commissioned an officer in 1983. Later, he was deployed to serve in the Iraq War.

In 2007, Michie graduated from the United States Army War College. The following year, he assumed command of the 157th Maneuver Enhancement Brigade. He became Land Component Commander  in 2012 and was promoted to brigadier general in 2013.

Awards Michie has received include the Bronze Star Medal, the Meritorious Service Medal, the Army Commendation Medal, the Army Achievement Medal, the Army Reserve Components Achievement Medal, the National Defense Service Medal, the Iraq Campaign Medal, the Global War on Terrorism Service Medal, the Humanitarian Service Medal and the Armed Forces Reserve Medal.

References

Year of birth missing (living people)
Living people
People from Oneida County, Wisconsin
Military personnel from Wisconsin
United States Army generals
National Guard (United States) generals
United States Army soldiers
United States Army personnel of the Iraq War
University of Wisconsin–Stevens Point alumni
United States Army War College alumni
Wisconsin National Guard personnel